Thiago Santos de Lima (born January 7, 1984) is a Brazilian mixed martial artist currently signed to the Professional Fighters League (PFL), competing in the light heavyweight division. Prior to signing with the PFL, Santos competed for the Ultimate Fighting Championship (UFC) in the light heavyweight and middleweight divisions, and he challenged for the UFC Light Heavyweight Championship once in July 2019. A professional competitor since 2010, he gained entrance into the UFC by competing on The Ultimate Fighter: Brazil 2.

Background
Santos was born into a poverty-stricken family in Rio de Janeiro. In early childhood, he suffered from an undiagnosed disease that spawned growing cysts in his stomach, but which were surgically removed. In one of the occasional floods in his city, Santos' family lost their belongings and after a period of homelessness, they settled in the notorious neighborhood of Cidade de Deus. Santos' father died just days after his mixed martial arts debut in 2010.

Mixed martial arts career

Early career
Before starting MMA, Santos trained in capoeira for eight years and was a Brazilian army paratrooper.

He made his professional MMA debut in October 2010. Before joining The Ultimate Fighter, he had a record of 8 wins and only 1 loss.

The Ultimate Fighter: Brazil
In March 2013, it was announced that Santos was part of the cast of The Ultimate Fighter: Brazil 2.

In the opening round, Santos defeated Gil Freitas by majority decision to get into the TUF house. He was the last pick when it came to the coaches' pick, ending up on Team Werdum. In the elimination round, Santos first faced Pedro Iriê and won by unanimous decision. In the quarterfinals, he faced eventual season winner Leonardo Santos and lost via unanimous decision.

Ultimate Fighting Championship
Despite not winning the show, Santos was signed to a contract by the UFC. He made his debut on August 3, 2013, at UFC 163 against The Ultimate Fighter: Brazil winner Cezar Ferreira. He lost the fight via submission in the first round.

For his second fight with the promotion, Santos faced Ronny Markes on March 23, 2014, at UFC Fight Night: Shogun vs. Henderson 2. He won the fight via TKO in the first round.

Santos faced Uriah Hall at UFC 175. He lost the fight via unanimous decision.

Santos next faced Andy Enz on January 30, 2015, at UFC 183. He won the fight via TKO in the first round.

Santos faced promotional newcomer Steve Bossé on June 27, 2015, at UFC Fight Night 70. He won the fight by knockout in the first round and earned a Performance of the Night bonus.

Santos faced Elias Theodorou on December 10, 2015, at UFC Fight Night 80. He won the fight by unanimous decision (29–28, 29–27, and 29–27).

Santos faced Nate Marquardt on May 14, 2016, at UFC 198. He won the fight via knockout in the first round.

Santos fought Gegard Mousasi on July 9, 2016, at UFC 200, filling in for an injured Derek Brunson. He lost the fight via knockout in the first round.

Santos fought Eric Spicely on September 24, 2016, at UFC Fight Night 95. In a large upset, he lost the fight by submission in the first round.

Santos faced Jack Marshman on February 19, 2017, at UFC Fight Night 105. He won the fight via TKO in the second round due to a combination of a spinning heel kick and punches and picked up a Performance of the Night bonus award.

Santos faced Gerald Meerschaert on July 8, 2017, at UFC 213. He won the fight via TKO in the second round.

Santos was briefly linked to a bout with promotional newcomer Michał Materla on October 21, 2017, at UFC Fight Night 118. However, it was revealed on 1 September that Materla had reneged on his agreement with the UFC and was re-signing with the Polish regional promotion KSW. In turn, Santos was removed from the card and faced Jack Hermansson a week later at UFC Fight Night 119. He won the fight via technical knock out in round one.

Santos faced Anthony Smith on February 3, 2018, at UFC Fight Night 125. He won the fight via technical knockout in round two. This win earned him the Fight of the Night bonus.

Santos faced David Branch on April 21, 2018, at UFC Fight Night 128. He lost the fight via knockout in round one.

Santos faced promotional newcomer Kevin Holland on August 4, 2018, at UFC 227. He won the fight by unanimous decision (29–27, 29–27, and 29–26).

Move to Light Heavyweight
Santos was scheduled to face Jimi Manuwa in a light heavyweight bout on September 22, 2018, at UFC Fight Night 137, replacing injured Glover Teixeira. Manuwa would also pull out of the bout on September 16, 2018 due to a torn hamstring and he was replaced by Eryk Anders. Santos defeated Anders via referee stoppage TKO when Anders failed to make it to his corner at the conclusion of round three. This win earned him the Fight of the Night award.

Santos faced Jimi Manuwa on December 8, 2018, at UFC 231. He won by KO on early 2nd round. This win earned him the Performance of the Night award and tied for most bout in a calendar year with 5.

Santos faced Jan Błachowicz on February 23, 2019, at UFC Fight Night 145. He won the fight by TKO in the third round. This win earned him the Performance of the Night award.

After going undefeated at 3–0 in Light Heavyweight bouts, Santos challenged Jon Jones for the UFC Light Heavyweight Championship in the main event at UFC 239 on July 6, 2019. He lost the back-and-forth fight via split decision. Despite the loss, Santos was the first fighter in MMA history to win a judge's scorecard against Jones. During the fight he sustained a torn left ACL, PCL, MCL, meniscus, and cracked tibia along with a partially torn right meniscus.

Santos was scheduled to Glover Teixeira on September 12, 2020 at UFC Fight Night 177. However, due to Teixeira tested positive for COVID-19 a week prior to the bout, the pair was rescheduled to fight on October 4, 2020 at UFC on ESPN: Holm vs. Aldana. In turn, on September 15, the bout was postponed again as Santos himself tested positive for the virus. The pairing with Teixeira eventually took place on November 7, 2020 at UFC on ESPN: Santos vs. Teixeira. Despite nearly finishing Teixeira on a couple occasions. Santos lost the fight via submission in round three.

Santos faced Aleksandar Rakić on March 6, 2021 at UFC 259. He lost the fight via unanimous decision.

Santos faced Johnny Walker on October 2, 2021 at UFC Fight Night 193. He won the fight via unanimous decision.

Santos faced Magomed Ankalaev on March 12, 2022 at UFC Fight Night 203. He lost the bout via unanimous decision.

Santos faced Jamahal Hill on August 6, 2022 at UFC on ESPN 40. He lost the fight via technical knockout. This fight earned him the Fight of the Night award.

Professional Fighters League
After fighting out his UFC contract, it was announced on September 8, 2022, that Santos had signed a multi-fight deal with the Professional Fighters League, and that he would be a participant in their 2023 season as a light heavyweight.

Santos will start of the 2023 season against Rob Wilkinson on April 1, 2023 at PFL 1.

Personal life
Santos has a son, Hiago, from a previous relationship. He is soccer player in Grêmio Foot-Ball Porto Alegrense.

Santos runs a non-profit organization that offers free mixed martial arts training for children coming from poor families.

Santos is in a relationship with fellow UFC athlete, Yana Kunitskaya. The pair got engaged in December, 2020, and in August 2021, Kunitskaya announced that they were expecting their first child together.

Championships and accomplishments
 Ultimate Fighting Championship
 Performance of the Night (Four times) 
 Fight of the Night (Three times) 
 Tied for most UFC bouts in a calendar year (5).
 Tied for most knockout victories in UFC Middleweight division history (eight) with Anderson Silva & Uriah Hall.
 MMATorch.com
 2015 Best Knockout of the Half-Year 
 MMAjunkie.com
 2018 Round of the Year (Round 1) vs. Jimi Manuwa
 2018 December Fight of the Month vs. Jimi Manuwa
 2018 Under-the-Radar Fighter of the Year

Mixed martial arts record

|-
|Loss
|align=center|22–11
|Jamahal Hill
|TKO (punches and elbows)
|UFC on ESPN: Santos vs. Hill
|
|align=center|4
|align=center|2:31
|Las Vegas, Nevada, United States
|
|-
|Loss
|align=center|22–10
|Magomed Ankalaev
|Decision (unanimous)
|UFC Fight Night: Santos vs. Ankalaev
|
|align=center|5
|align=center|5:00
|Las Vegas, Nevada, United States
|
|-
|Win
|align=center|22–9
|Johnny Walker
|Decision (unanimous)
|UFC Fight Night: Santos vs. Walker
|
|align=center|5
|align=center|5:00
|Las Vegas, Nevada, United States
|
|-
|Loss
|align=center|21–9
|Aleksandar Rakić
|Decision (unanimous)
|UFC 259
|
|align=center|3
|align=center|5:00
|Las Vegas, Nevada, United States
|
|-
|Loss
|align=center|21–8
|Glover Teixeira
|Submission (rear-naked choke)
|UFC on ESPN: Santos vs. Teixeira
|
|align=center|3
|align=center|1:49
|Las Vegas, Nevada, United States
|
|-
|Loss
|align=center|21–7
|Jon Jones
|Decision (split)
|UFC 239 
|
|align=center|5
|align=center|5:00
|Las Vegas, Nevada, United States
|
|-
|Win
|align=center|21–6
|Jan Błachowicz
|TKO (punches)
|UFC Fight Night: Błachowicz vs. Santos
|
|align=center|3
|align=center|0:39
|Prague, Czech Republic
|
|-
|Win
|align=center|20–6
|Jimi Manuwa
|KO (punch)
|UFC 231
|
|align=center|2
|align=center|0:41
|Toronto, Ontario, Canada
|
|-
|Win
|align=center|19–6
|Eryk Anders
|TKO (referee stoppage)
|UFC Fight Night: Santos vs. Anders
|
|align=center|3
|align=center|5:00
|São Paulo, Brazil
|
|-
|Win
|align=center|18–6
|Kevin Holland
|Decision (unanimous)
|UFC 227
|
|align=center|3
|align=center|5:00
|Los Angeles, California, United States
|
|-
|Loss
|align=center|17–6
|David Branch
|KO (punches)
|UFC Fight Night: Barboza vs. Lee
|
|align=center|1
|align=center|2:30
|Atlantic City, New Jersey, United States
|
|-
|Win
|align=center|17–5
|Anthony Smith
|TKO (body kick and punches)
|UFC Fight Night: Machida vs. Anders
|
|align=center|2
|align=center|1:03
|Belém, Brazil
|
|-
|Win
|align=center|16–5
|Jack Hermansson
|TKO (body kick and punches)
|UFC Fight Night: Brunson vs. Machida
|
|align=center|1
|align=center|4:59
|São Paulo, Brazil
|
|-
|Win
|align=center|15–5
|Gerald Meerschaert
|TKO (punches)
|UFC 213
|
|align=center|2
|align=center|2:04
|Las Vegas, Nevada, United States
|
|-
|Win
|align=center|14–5
|Jack Marshman
|TKO (spinning wheel kick and punches)
|UFC Fight Night: Lewis vs. Browne
|
|align=center|2
|align=center|2:21
|Halifax, Nova Scotia, Canada
|
|-
|Loss
|align=center|13–5
|Eric Spicely
|Submission (rear-naked choke)
|UFC Fight Night: Cyborg vs. Lansberg
|
|align=center|1
|align=center|2:58
|Brasília, Brazil
|
|-
|Loss
|align=center|13–4
|Gegard Mousasi
|KO (punches)
|UFC 200
|
|align=center|1
|align=center|4:32
|Las Vegas, Nevada, United States
|
|-
|Win
|align=center|13–3
|Nate Marquardt
|KO (punches)
|UFC 198
|
|align=center|1
|align=center|3:39
|Curitiba, Brazil
|
|-
|Win
|align=center|12–3
|Elias Theodorou
| Decision (unanimous)
|UFC Fight Night: Namajunas vs. VanZant
|
|align=center|3
|align=center|5:00
|Las Vegas, Nevada, United States
|
|-
|Win
|align=center|11–3
|Steve Bossé
|KO (head kick)
|UFC Fight Night: Machida vs. Romero
|
|align=center|1
|align=center|0:29
|Hollywood, Florida, United States
|
|-
|Win
|align=center|10–3
|Andy Enz
|TKO (body kick and punches)
|UFC 183
|
|align=center|1
|align=center|1:56
|Las Vegas, Nevada, United States
|
|-
|Loss
|align=center|9–3
|Uriah Hall
|Decision (unanimous)
|UFC 175
|
|align=center|3
|align=center|5:00
|Las Vegas, Nevada, United States
|
|-
|Win
|align=center|9–2
|Ronny Markes
|TKO (body kick and punches)
|UFC Fight Night: Shogun vs. Henderson 2
|
|align=center|1
|align=center|0:53
|Natal, Brazil
|
|-
|Loss
|align=center|8–2
|Cezar Ferreira
|Submission (guillotine choke)
|UFC 163
|
|align=center|1
|align=center|0:47
|Rio de Janeiro, Brazil
|
|-
|Win
|align=center|8–1
|Denis Figueira
|TKO (head kick and punches)
|Watch Out Combat Show 20
|
|align=center|1
|align=center|N/A
|Rio de Janeiro, Brazil
|
|-
|Loss
|align=center|7–1
|Vicente Luque
|TKO (punches)
|Spartan MMA 2012
|
|align=center|1
|align=center|4:50
|São Luís, Brazil
|
|-
|Win
|align=center|7–0
|Junior Vidal
|TKO (punches)
|Watch Out Combat Show 18
|
|align=center|1
|align=center|N/A
|Rio de Janeiro, Brazil
|
|-
|Win
|align=center|6–0
|Eneas Souza
|Submission (rear-naked choke)
|Watch Out Combat Show 17
|
|align=center|3
|align=center|2:50
|Rio de Janeiro, Brazil
|
|-
|Win
|align=center|5–0
|Marcos Viggiani
|Decision (unanimous)
|Spartan MMA 2011
|
|align=center|3
|align=center|5:00
|Rio de Janeiro, Brazil
|
|-
|Win
|align=center|4–0
|Rafael Braga
|TKO (punches)
|Explosion Fight
|
|align=center|1
|align=center|N/A
|Rio de Janeiro, Brazil
|
|-
|Win
|align=center|3–0
|Mauricio Chueke
|Decision (unanimous)
|Watch Out Combat Show 14
|
|align=center|3
|align=center|5:00
|Rio de Janeiro, Brazil
|
|-
|Win
|align=center|2–0
|Gabriel Barreiro
|TKO (retirement)
|Senna Fight
|
|align=center|2
|align=center|1:53
|Rio de Janeiro, Brazil
|
|-
|Win
|align=center|1–0
|Guilherme Benedito
|Decision (unanimous)
|Watch Out Combat Show 10
|
|align=center|3
|align=center|5:00
|Rio de Janeiro, Brazil
|
|}

| Loss
| align=center| 2–2
| Leonardo Santos
| Decision (unanimous)
| rowspan=4|The Ultimate Fighter: Brazil 2
| N/A (airdate)
| align=center| 2
| align=center| 5:00
| rowspan=4|São Paulo, Brazil
| 
|-
| Win
| align=center| 2–1
| Pedro Iriê
| Decision (unanimous)
| N/A (airdate)
| align=center| 2
| align=center| 5:00
| 
|-
| Loss
| align=center| 1–1
| William Macário
| Decision (unanimous)
| N/A (airdate)
| align=center| 2
| align=center| 5:00
| 
|-
| Win
| align=center| 1–0
| Gil Freitas
| Decision (majority)
|  (airdate)
| align=center| 2
| align=center| 5:00
|

See also
List of current PFL fighters
List of male mixed martial artists

References

External links

1984 births
Living people
Brazilian male mixed martial artists
Sportspeople from Rio de Janeiro (city)
Brazilian capoeira practitioners
Brazilian Muay Thai practitioners
Brazilian practitioners of Brazilian jiu-jitsu
People awarded a black belt in Brazilian jiu-jitsu
Light heavyweight mixed martial artists
Middleweight mixed martial artists
Welterweight mixed martial artists
Mixed martial artists utilizing capoeira
Mixed martial artists utilizing Muay Thai
Mixed martial artists utilizing Brazilian jiu-jitsu
Ultimate Fighting Championship male fighters